This is a listing of the horses that finished in either first, second, or third place and the number of starters in the Geisha Handicap, a Restricted Maryland-bred thoroughbred Stakes Race on dirt at 1-1/16 miles (8.5 furlongs) at Pimlico Race Course  in Baltimore, Maryland.

A # signifies that the race was run in two divisions in 1976.

References

 Maryland Thoroughbred official website

Pimlico Race Course
Laurel Park Racecourse